Jequetepeque is a town in Northern Peru, capital of the district Jequetepeque in Pacasmayo Province of La Libertad Region. This town is located some 117 km north Trujillo city and is primarily an agricultural center in the Jequetepeque Valley.

Nearby cities
Chepén
Guadalupe
Pacasmayo

See also
Jequetepeque Valley
Pacasmayo
Chepén

References

Populated places in La Libertad Region